This glossary of engineering terms is a list of definitions about the major concepts of engineering. Please see the bottom of the page for glossaries of specific fields of engineering.

A

B

C

D

E

F

G

H

I

J

K

L

M–Z

See also 

Engineering
National Council of Examiners for Engineering and Surveying
Fundamentals of Engineering Examination
Principles and Practice of Engineering Examination
Graduate Aptitude Test in Engineering
Glossary of aerospace engineering
Glossary of civil engineering
Glossary of electrical and electronics engineering
Glossary of mechanical engineering
Glossary of structural engineering
Glossary of architecture
Glossary of areas of mathematics
Glossary of artificial intelligence
Glossary of astronomy
Glossary of biology
Glossary of calculus
Glossary of chemistry
Glossary of ecology
Glossary of economics
Glossary of physics
Glossary of probability and statistics

Notes

References

Works cited
 

Engineering
Engineering disciplines
engineering
Safety
Engineering
Wikipedia glossaries using description lists